The J. Roy Bond House, at 317 College St. in Elizabethtown, Kentucky, is a historic Craftsman-style house built in 1914.  It was listed on the National Register of Historic Places in 1988.

It is a two-story frame and stucco house with a jerkinhead-roofed one-story front porch.  It was designed by Louisville, Kentucky architect W. Earl Gore and was built by real estate developer J. Roy Bond.

It was deemed "significant as the finest example of the Craftsman style in Elizabethtown. The house displays typical Craftsman detailing on the exterior such as exposed half-timbering and the use of stucco, stone and frame siding. The interior is also notable with exposed beams, Craftsman style light fixtures, window seats and decorative brick fireplaces."

References

American Craftsman architecture in Kentucky
Houses on the National Register of Historic Places in Kentucky
Houses completed in 1914
National Register of Historic Places in Hardin County, Kentucky
Elizabethtown, Kentucky
Houses in Hardin County, Kentucky
1914 establishments in Kentucky